This is How I Feel is the fifth studio album by the R&B singer Tank. It was released by Atlantic Records on May 8, 2012.

Singles
The album first single "Compliments" was released on October 17, 2011. It features Kris Stephens, and on the album version it fellow rapper T.I. The second single "Next Breath" was released on January 3, 2012.

Critical response

David Jeffries of AllMusic wrote that "Long a cross between Brian McKnight and R. Kelly, R&B's smooth – but chiseled – operator Tank tips the scales toward the [Kelly] side on his 2012 release, filling the album with dreamy, lush productions and 'adults-only' lyrics that sometimes reach the level of 'shameful adults only'." PopMatters editor David Amidon found that This Is How I Feel "clocks in as Tank’s shortest project yet at just ten tracks and 40 minutes, but somehow it still manages to be something of a trial to get through [...] If you’re just an unabashed fan of male R&B vocals, or the sight of Tank’s pecs on the cover has some sort of brainwashing effect on you, This Is How I Feel might be worth a few cursory spins on Spotify or what have you, but otherwise this is a release that will come and go with very little fanfare."

Chart performance
This Is How I Feel sold 30,000 copies in its first week of release.

Track listing
 

Samples
"Lonely" contains elements of "My Heart Belongs to You" as performed by Jodeci.

Personnel
Credits for This Is How I Feel adapted from Allmusic.

* Rebecca Alexis – Stylist 
 Marcella Araica – Composer 
 Marcella "Ms. Lago" Araica – Engineer, Mixing 
 John Armstrong – Engineer 
 Durrell Babbs – Composer, Executive Producer, Producer 
 Paul Bailey – Engineer 
 Aaron Bay–Schuck – A&R 
 Floyd E. Bentley III  Composer 
 Britney Bereal – Vocals (Background) 
 Charlie Bereal – Guitar 
 Lonny Bereal – Composer 
 Josh Berg – Engineer 
 Luke Boyd – Composer, Vocals (Background) 
 Chris Brown – Composer, Featured Artist 
 Sammie Bush – Composer, Vocals (Background) 
 Clifford Harris – Composer 
 The Composer – Producer 
 Danja – Producer 
 Donald DeGrate – Composer 
 Dustin Douglass – Engineer 
 Lanre Gaba – A&R 
 Doug Geikie – Engineer 
 Jimmy Gonzales – Engineer 
 Cedric Hailey – Composer 
 Trehy Harris – Assistant 
 Nico Hartikainen – Engineer 
 Patrick "Guitarboy" Hayes  Composer, Producer 
 Nate Hills – Composer 
 Eric Hudson – Composer, Producer 
 Jaycen Joshua – Mixing 

 David Kutch – Mastering 
 Christian Lantry – Photography 
 William Marshall – Hair Stylist, Make–Up 
 Kevin McCall – Composer, Producer, Vocals (Background) 
 Peter Mokran – Mixing 
 Melvin R. Monroe III  Composer 
 Mark Obriski – Art Direction, Design 
 Rhea Pasricha – A&R 
 Micah Powell – Composer, Vocals (Background)
 Erik Reichers – Engineer 
 Rex Rideout – Additional Production 
 Poet Ed Sanders – Assistant 
 Phil Scott III – Engineer 
 James "J–Doe" Smith – Composer 
 Jerren Spruill – Composer 
 Jerren "J–Kits" Spruill – Producer 
 Marsha St. Hubert – Marketing 
 Kris Stephens – Featured Artist 
 Kristina Stephens – Composer 
 T.I. – Featured Artist 
 Tank – Primary Artist, Producer 
 Troy Taylor – Composer, Producer 
 T–Minus – Producer 
 Alex Heme Toval – Engineer 
 Carolyn Tracey – Package Production 
 Sergio "Sergical" Tsai – Engineer 
 Christopher Umana – Composer, Producer 
 Vincent Watson – Composer 
 Vincent "Invincible" Watson – Producer

Charts

Weekly charts

Year-end charts

Release history

References

2012 albums
Tank (American singer) albums
Atlantic Records albums
Albums produced by Danja (record producer)
Albums produced by Eric Hudson
Albums produced by T-Minus (record producer)